Buckeye may refer to:

Relating to the US state of Ohio

 Buckeye (nickname), a nickname for residents of the U.S. state of Ohio, the "buckeye state"
 Ohio State Buckeyes, the intercollegiate athletic teams of the Ohio State University
 Brutus Buckeye, the mascot of the Ohio State University
 Aesculus glabra, also known as the Ohio buckeye, Ohio's state tree
 Cleveland Buckeyes, a Negro league baseball franchise, 1942–1950
 Buckeyes, the athletic teams of Nelsonville-York High School, Nelsonville, Ohio

Arts and media
 "Buckeye", a song by Lamb of God on the album Burn the Priest
 Nathan "Buckeye" Heywood or Citizen Steel, a DC Comics character

Businesses
 Buckeye Broadband, a cable company
 Buckeye Industries, an American aircraft manufacturer
 Buckeye Partners, a petroleum distributor based in Texas, US
 Buckeye Steel Castings, a former steelmaker in Columbus, Ohio

Places 

 Buckeye, Arizona 
 Buckeye, California (disambiguation) 
 Buckeye, Colorado
 Buckeye, Indiana
 Buckeye, Iowa
 Buckeye, Kansas
 Buckeye, Kentucky
 Buckeye, Missouri
 Buckeye Township (disambiguation)
 Buckeye, Washington
 Buckeye, West Virginia
 Buckeye, Ohio, which also houses the "Buckeye Furnace" and the Buckeye Furnace Covered Bridge
 Buckeye Lake, Ohio
 Buckeye Trail, a long-distance trail in Ohio
 Buckeye–Shaker, a neighborhood of Cleveland, Ohio

Science and technology

Biology
 Buckeye (tree), several tree species of the genus Aesculus
 Buckeye chicken, a breed of chicken originating in Ohio
 Buckeye rot of tomato
 Junonia coenia, also called buckeye, a butterfly in the family Nymphalidae found in the United States and Canada

Other uses in science and technology
 Buckeye, a named passenger train operated by the Pennsylvania Railroad between Cleveland, Ohio and Pittsburgh, Pennsylvania
 Buckeye coupler, a railway car coupler
 North American T-2 Buckeye, an aircraft

Other uses
 Buckeye candy, a peanut butter and chocolate candy resembling the nut of a buckeye tree
 Buckeye Division, or 37th Infantry Division, of the US Army
 Garland Buckeye (1897–1975), former professional football and baseball player

See also
 Bukeye, in the country of Burundi